The 1834 Connecticut gubernatorial election was held on April 7, 1834. Former senator and Whig nominee Samuel A. Foot was elected, defeating incumbent governor and Democratic nominee Henry W. Edwards with 49.83% of the vote.

Foot won a plurality of the vote, but fell just short of a majority, by 63 votes. The state constitution required in that case, the Connecticut General Assembly would elect the governor. Foot won the vote in the state legislature, 154 to 70, and was elected governor.

This was the first appearance of the Whig Party, also known as the "Young Men's Party", in a Connecticut gubernatorial election.

General election

Candidates
Major party candidates

Samuel A. Foot, Whig (sometimes listed as Young Men's)
Henry W. Edwards, Democratic

Candidates
Minor party candidates

Zalmon Storrs, Anti-Masonic

Results

References

1834
Connecticut
Gubernatorial